The Nanyang Fleet was one of the four modernised Chinese naval fleets in the late Qing Dynasty.  Established in the 1870s, the fleet suffered losses in the Sino-French War, escaped intact in the Sino-Japanese War, and was formally abolished in 1909.

Composition, 1884
Before 1885 the Southern Seas (Nanyang) Fleet, based at Shanghai, was the largest of China's four regional fleets. In the early 1880s its best ships were the modern composite cruiser Kaiji, completed in 1884 at the Foochow Navy Yard, the composite sloops Kangji and Chengching, also recent products of the Foochow Navy Yard (1878 and 1880), and the 2,630-ton wooden steam frigate Yuyuan, built at the Kiangnan Arsenal in 1873.  The fleet was originally to have had the four steel Rendel gunboats Zhendong, Zhenxi, Zhennan and Zhenbei, completed in 1879, but Li Hongzhang was so impressed by them that he took them over for the Beiyang Fleet, compensating the Nanyang Fleet with Longxiang, Huwei, Feiting and Cedian, four iron Rendel 'alphabetical' gunboats that had been in service at Tianjin since 1876.

Besides these relatively modern gunboats the fleet also included the elderly wooden gunboats Caojiang, Zehai, Weijing  and Jingyuan, the first three products of the Kiangnan Arsenal (1869 and 1870) and the fourth built at the Foochow Navy Yard in 1872.  Other vessels with the fleet or operating on the Yangzi River in 1884 included the composite sloops Chaowu and Chengqing, both built at the Foochow Navy Yard (1878 and 1880); the 2,630-ton wooden steam frigate Haian, built at the Kiangnan Arsenal in 1872; the wooden transports Yuankai and Dengyingzhou, both built at the Foochow Navy Yard (1875 and 1876); and the tiny ironclad Jinou, an experimental product of the Kiangnan Arsenal (1876) nicknamed derisively by Europeans 'the terror of the Western world'.

In July 1884, on the eve of the Sino-French War, the Nanyang fleet was reinforced by the German-built steel cruisers Nanrui and Nanchen, which sailed from Germany in March 1884.

Table 1: Composition of the Nanyang fleet, August 1884

The Sino-French War (August 1884–April 1885)

The commander of the Nanyang fleet during the Sino-French War was Admiral Li Chengmou (李成謀), who had earlier commanded the Fujian fleet and the traditional Yangtze water forces.

Most of the ships of the Nanyang fleet remained safely in harbour at Shanghai or Nanking during the Sino-French War (August 1884–April 1885). In July 1884 the French ironclad Triomphante observed the presence of the Nanyang fleet at Shanghai. Her commander, capitaine de vaisseau Baux, cabled Admiral Amédée Courbet for permission to attack the Chinese with Triomphante and the cruiser d'Estaing. Jules Ferry's cabinet considered the merits of an attack on the Nanyang fleet, but decided that the risks to business confidence were too great, and notified Courbet that no naval action would be permitted at Shanghai. Courbet thereupon ordered Triomphante and d'Estaing to leave Shanghai and join him in the Min River, where he was concentrating his squadron against the Fujian Fleet and the Foochow Navy Yard. The French cruiser Parseval was sent to Shanghai in early August to keep the Nanyang Fleet under observation.

Courbet's attack on the Fujian Fleet on 23 August 1884 at the Battle of Fuzhou plunged France and China into war. The Nanyang Fleet commanders responded by splitting the fleet to protect Shanghai and the Nanking Arsenal, both plausible targets for future French naval descents. The Rendel gunboats Longxiang, Feiting, Cedian and Huwei remained at Shanghai, and the frigate Haian was filled with stones and prepared as a blockship, to be sunk across the entrance to the Huangpu river if the French showed themselves in force. The German-built cruisers Nanrui and Nanchen, together with several other ships of the Nanyang Fleet, withdrew to Nanking. In late August 1884 Admiral Courbet ordered Parseval to leave Shanghai. The lone French cruiser had lain within range of the Nanyang Fleet for a whole week after the outbreak of war, but the Chinese made no attempt to attack her. On the night of 30 August 1884 capitaine de vaisseau Thounens of Parseval ran the gauntlet of the guns of the Wusong forts and escaped without casualties to the open sea. The Nanyang Fleet did nothing whatsoever to hinder his departure.

Part of the Nanyang fleet made a disastrous sortie in February 1885 to try to break the French blockade of Formosa.  The frigate Yuyuan and the composite sloop Chengqing were sunk in the Battle of Shipu (14 February 1885), the former by a French torpedo attack and the latter by friendly fire. Kaiji, Nanrui, Nanchen, Chaowu, Yuankai and two 'alphabetical' gunboats were trapped in Zhenhai Bay by the French on 1 March 1885 and ignominiously blockaded there for the rest of the war.

Postwar Development
The loss of Yuyuan and Chengqing in February 1885 eroded the Nanyang Fleet's advantage over the Northern Seas Fleet (Beiyang Fleet). During the following decade the Nanyang fleet gradually lost its primacy, as Li Hongzhang invested heavily in the Beiyang Fleet. By 1894, on the eve of the Sino-Japanese War, the Beiyang Fleet had a comfortable superiority over the Nanyang Fleet both in numbers of ships and quality.

Nevertheless, the Nanyang fleet continued to acquire new ships after the Sino-French War, some of reasonable quality.  The first of the new ships was the steel cruiser Baomin, completed at the Kiangnan Arsenal in 1885.  The next additions were the composite cruisers Jingqing and Huantai, both products of the Foochow Navy Yard (1886 and 1887).

Table 2: Additions to the Nanyang fleet, 1885–94

Ships of the Nanyang Fleet

Notes

References

 Arlington, L. C., Through the Dragon's Eyes (London, 1931)
 Duboc, E., Trente cinq mois de campagne en Chine, au Tonkin (Paris, 1899)
 Loir, M., L'escadre de l'amiral Courbet (Paris, 1886)
 Lung Chang [龍章], Yueh-nan yu Chung-fa chan-cheng [越南與中法戰爭, Vietnam and the Sino-French War] (Taipei, 1993)
 Rawlinson, J., China's Struggle for Naval Development, 1839–1895 (Harvard, 1967)
 Wright, R., The Chinese Steam Navy, 1862–1945 (London, 2001)

Chinese fleets
Military units and formations of the Qing dynasty
Naval history of China
Sino-French War